Chepelyovo is a rural locality (a village) in Stremilovskoye Rural Settlement of Chekhovsky District, Moscow Oblast, Russia, situated along the Old Simferopolskoye highway, about  from the town of Chekhov  from Moscow's MKAD. The railroad platform also called Chepelyovo is situated to the southwest of the village.

There is a large summer colony in the vicinity which was originally created by gardening fans working for the Soviet Ministry of Interior (over 1000 land plots) and which in summer month substantially exceeds the village itself in population.

References

Rural localities in Moscow Oblast